Shermar Bracey (born July 1, 1982 in Chicago, Illinois) is a running back formerly of the Saskatchewan Roughriders of the Canadian Football League.

Bracey was signed as a free agent by Saskatchewan in 2006. He made his professional debut on August 19 versus the Hamilton Tiger-Cats, carrying the ball eight times for 50 yards in relief of starting running back Kenton Keith. Bracey ended the year with 38 carries for 233 yards and three touchdowns. He was released by the Riders on August 8, 2007 and re-signed on August 15, 2007. He was released again by the Riders on August 27, 2007.

In college, Bracey played for Arkansas State University.

References 
 Statistics from Bracey's CFL debut August 19, 2006

Bracey's 2006 CFL statistics

1982 births
Living people
Arkansas State Red Wolves football players
Edmonton Elks players
Players of Canadian football from Chicago
Saskatchewan Roughriders players
American players of Canadian football